The Political Song Network was a British national network of political singers, songwriters, and musicians founded at a meeting in London in October 1986. Founders included Roy Bailey, Pam Bishop, Ros Kane, Sandra Kerr, Angela McKee, John Pole, Leon Rosselson, Janet Russell, Ivan Sears, Bob Wakeling, and Jim Woodland. It produced a quarterly newsletter and various publications.

Publications 
 Red and Green Songs 
 Songs for the Nineties

Recordings 
 Shades of Political Song POKE Records PROD 004

Music organisations based in the United Kingdom
Political activists